Since its foundation in 1913, the Royal Australian Navy has operated a large number of vessels, including various types of warships, support and supply warships.

Current ships

As of March 2022, the strength of the Royal Australian Navy consists of 43 commissioned vessels, plus 3 non-commissioned vessels.

Non-commissioned ships

Past ships

A

B

C

D

E

F

G

H

I

J

K

L

M

N

O

P

Q

R

S

T

U

V

W

Y

See also

 Amphibious warfare ships of Australia

References
Royal Australian Navy website
Current Ships (ships active in service)
Ship Histories (decommissioned ships)

Navy
 
Ships